IV Corps (IV. Armeekorps) was a corps level command of the German Army (Wehrmacht) before and during World War II.

History
The IV Army Corps was formed on 1 October 1934 in Wehrkreis IV (4th Military District) in Dresden by the expansion of the 4th Infantry Division of the Reichswehr.

It was destroyed in the Battle of Stalingrad on 31 January 1943 and reformed on 20 July 1943.
The Corps was again destroyed in August 1944 during the Soviet Jassy–Kishinev Offensive, and its commander killed.
The Corps was redesignated as IV Panzer Corps on 10 October 1944 and as Panzer Corps Feldherrnhalle on 27 November 1944.

Area of operations
Poland (September 1939 – May 1940)
France (May 1940 – June 1941)
Eastern Front, southern sector (June 1941 – October 1942)
Stalingrad (October 1942 – January 1943)
Eastern Front, southern sector (July 1943 – October 1944)

Commanders 

 General der Infanterie Wilhelm List, (1 October 1935 - 4 February 1938)
 General der Infanterie Viktor von Schwedler, (4 February 1938 - 1 November 1942)
 General der Pioniere Erwin Jaenecke, (1 November 1942 - 17 January 1943)
 General der Artillerie Max Pfeffer, (17 - 31 January 1943)
 General der Infanterie Friedrich Mieth, (20 July 1943 - 10 October 1944) KIA on 2 September 1944

See also 
 List of German corps in World War II

References 

Army,04
Panzer corps of Germany in World War II
Military units and formations established in 1934
Military units and formations disestablished in 1943
Military units and formations established in 1943
Military units and formations disestablished in 1944